This is a list of places in Vietnam which have standing links to local communities in other countries known as "town twinning" (usually in Europe) or "sister cities" (usually in the rest of the world).

B
Bà Rịa–Vũng Tàu
 Padang, Indonesia

Bắc Ninh
 Cheb, Czech Republic

Biên Hòa
 Gimhae, South Korea

Bình Dương
 Daejeon, South Korea

C
Cần Thơ

 Kaposvár, Hungary
 Riverside, United States
 Shantou, China

D
Da Nang

 Battambang, Cambodia
 Champasak, Laos
 Changwon, South Korea
 Daegu, South Korea
 Haiphong, Vietnam
 Kunming, China
 Mukdahan, Thailand
 Oakland, United States
 Pittsburgh, United States
 Savannakhet, Laos
 Tangier, Morocco
 Timișoara, Romania
 Toluca, Mexico

Đồng Tháp
 Cheorwon, South Korea

H
Hạ Long

 Fuzhou, China
 Guilin, China

Hải Dương
 Suwon, South Korea

Haiphong

 Da Nang, Vietnam
 Incheon, South Korea
 Kitakyushu, Japan
 Livorno, Italy
 Nanning, China
 Saint Petersburg, Russia
 Seattle, United States
 Tianjin, China

Hanoi

 Ankara, Turkey
 Astana, Kazakhstan
 Bangkok, Thailand
 Beijing, China
 Fukuoka Prefecture, Japan
 Ho Chi Minh City, Vietnam
 Huế, Vietnam
 Jakarta, Indonesia
 Minsk, Belarus
 Moscow, Russia
 Palermo, Italy
 Phnom Penh, Cambodia
 Pretoria, South Africa
 Seoul, South Korea
 Victoria, Seychelles
 Warsaw, Poland

Ho Chi Minh City

 Ahmadi, Kuwait
 Almaty, Kazakhstan
 Auvergne-Rhône-Alpes, France
 Bangkok, Thailand
 Champasak, Laos
 Busan, South Korea
 Guangdong Province, China
 Guangxi Zhuang Autonomous Region, China
 Hanoi, Vietnam
 Huế, Vietnam
 Leipzig, Germany
 Lyon, France
 Manila, Philippines
 Minsk, Belarus
 Moscow, Russia
 Osaka Prefecture, Japan
 Phnom Penh, Cambodia
 Saint Petersburg, Russia
 San Francisco, United States
 Shandong Province, China
 Shanghai, China
 Sofia, Bulgaria
 Vientiane, Laos
 Vladivostok, Russia
 Yangon, Myanmar
 Zhejiang Province, China

Hội An

 Kiama, Australia
 Szentendre, Hungary
 Wernigerode, Germany

Huế

 Gyeongju, South Korea
 Hanoi, Vietnam
 Ho Chi Minh City, Vietnam
 Honolulu, United States
 Namur, Belgium
 New Haven, United States
 Yogyakarta, Indonesia

K
Khánh Hòa
 Ulsan, South Korea

M
Mỹ Tho
 Changwon, South Korea

N
Nam Dinh
 Prato, Italy

Q
Quảng Nam
 Osan, South Korea

Quảng Trị
 Angel Fire, United States

T
Thái Bình
 Pazardzhik, Bulgaria

V
Vinh
 Namyangju, South Korea

Vĩnh Yên
 Liuzhou, China

References

Vietnam
Vietnam geography-related lists
Foreign relations of Vietnam
Cities in Vietnam
Lists of populated places in Vietnam